Emmanuel Olayiwola Adeyemi (July 11, 1950 – October 30, 2019) was a Nigerian businessman. He was the Founder and Chairman of Fumman Nigeria, an indigenous conglomerate with interests in Manufacturing, Chemicals, Agric and Agro Allied business sectors. He is most known for creating Fumman juice, one of the leading brand of fruit juice in Nigeria.

Early life 
Adeyemi, a Yoruba ethnic Christian from Ogbomoso, Oyo State was born into the family of Timothy Adisa Adeyemi and Deborah Adunni Adeyemi in the City of Lagos. He had his primary education at Igbo ora High School and afterwards progressed to Olivet Baptist High School for his Higher Secondary School Education and proceeded on to the University of Lagos where he graduated with a honors degree in Business Administration in 1974.

After graduation from the University of Lagos, Adeyemi worked in the Nigerian Customs and PZ industries before venturing out to follow his dreams and set up Fumman Nigeria Limited in 1981.

Business career 
Adeyemi started FUMMAN on September 1981 with N424 (Four Hundred and Twenty Four Naira) and a focus on industrial watered chemicals which offers cleaning services and chemical solutions to industries, before moving into the agricultural sector with Fumman Agricultural Products Industries Limited in 1995 after the purchase of Lafia Canning Factory. The FUMMAN name according to him is a combination of his wife's first name, Funmi and his name, Emmanuel.

Adeyemi represented the African, Pacific and Caribbean countries during the Agro-Industry event of 2002 which was sponsored by the European Union and the ADB. And in 2003 he was appointed the Chairman of Ghana/Nigeria fruit growers and processors associations in Akosombo, Ghana. He was later appointed as the Chairman of ECOWAS Mango Stakeholders Forum.

In 2010, Adeyemi moved the agricultural arm of Fumman to cover a wider region of Nigeria and other parts of West Africa. In 2013 he was selected as one of the panelists at the 19th Nigerian Economic Summit to identify ways of building a commodities exchange to expand agricultural markets.

Personal life 
Emmanuel Adeyemi married Olufunmilayo Amos, a professor of Pharmacy, in 1978, and they have three children together.

He was known for his Christian faith and was a devout Baptist Christian until his death on October 30, 2019 at the age of 69 in Lagos, Nigeria.

References 

1950 births
2019 deaths
Nigerian businesspeople